The Yucatán worm snake (Amerotyphlops microstomus) is a species of snake in the Typhlopidae family.

References

microstomus
Reptiles described in 1866